Isaiah Malachai Tayne Jones (born 21 September 2001) is an English professional footballer who plays as a defender for Chesham United

Career
Isaiah Jones started his youth academy career at   club Southampton F.C in 2014, where he stayed until 2018.

Jones would make the summer move up to Gloucestershire where he sign a two-year deal at Forest Green Rovers F.C in 2018, during the 2019–20 EFL Trophy, Jones made two appearances for Forest Green, against Southampton U21 and Walsall. In October 2019, Cirencester Town signed Jones on a one-month loan deal. On 12 October 2019, Jones scored on his debut for Cirencester, in a 3–2 FA Trophy defeat against Basingstoke Town.

Career statistics

References

2001 births
Living people
Footballers from Wandsworth
Association football defenders
English footballers
Forest Green Rovers F.C. players
Cirencester Town F.C. players
Chesham United F.C. players